The Scenery Preservation Act was an Act of Parliament passed in 1903 in New Zealand.

The Act provided up to £25,000 a year for compulsory purchase of land of scenic or historic interest, under the Public Works Act 1894. It was introduced by Joseph Ward, Minister of Tourism and Publicity in the Liberal government, following campaigning by Leonard Cockayne and Harry Ell. The Act was amended in 1906, 1908, 1910 and 1926 and replaced by the Reserves and Domains Act 1953.

See also
Environment of New Zealand
Conservation in New Zealand

References

Further reading
Tony Nightingale and Paul Dingwall, Our picturesque heritage: 100 years of scenery preservation in New Zealand, Department of Conservation, Wellington, 2003

Statutes of New Zealand
Environmental law in New Zealand
1903 in New Zealand
1903 in New Zealand law
Repealed New Zealand legislation
1903 in the environment
Historic preservation in New Zealand